The A81 road is a major road in Scotland.

The A81 has been ranked among the five most dangerous roads in Scotland based on serious and fatal accidents between 2007 and 2009, in proportion to volume of traffic.

Notes

Roads in Scotland
Transport in Glasgow
Transport in Stirling (council area)
Transport in East Dunbartonshire
Maryhill
Bearsden
Milngavie
Callander